Gunachaur is a village in Shaheed Bhagat Singh Nagar district of Punjab State, India. The village is administrated by Sarpanch an elected representative of the village.

Demography 
As of 2011, Gunachaur has a total number of 784 houses and population of 3808 of which 1986 include are males while 1822 are females according to the report published by Census India in 2011. The literacy rate of Gunachaur is 78.86%, higher than the state average of 75.84%. The population of children under the age of 6 years is 383 which is 10.06% of total population of Gunachaur, and child sex ratio is approximately 877 as compared to Punjab state average of 846.

Most of the people are from Schedule Caste which constitutes 69.33% of total population in Gunachaur. The town does not have any Schedule Tribe population so far.

As per the report published by Census India in 2011, 1237 people were engaged in work activities out of the total population of Gunachaur which includes 1096 males and 141 females. According to census survey report 2011, 86.50% workers describe their work as main work and 13.50% workers are involved in Marginal activity providing livelihood for less than 6 months.

Education 

Amardeep Singh Shergill Memorial college Mukandpur and Sikh National College Banga are the nearest colleges.

Transport 

See also 
List of villages in India

References

External links 
 Tourism of Punjab
 Census of Punjab
 Locality Based PINCode

Villages in Shaheed Bhagat Singh Nagar district